Ashu Sharma is an Indian television and film actor. He is well known for portraying the character of Satyendra Bharadwaj in Colors TV's second-longest-running series, Sasural Simar Ka.
He also appears in Sony SAB's Tera Yaar Hoon Main.

Career

Film career (2009–2011, 2016)
Sharma started his film career with the top-grossing black comedy drama Dev.D (2009), where he played a Canadian boy, and followed it by starring in the thrillers Teen Patti and No One Killed Jessica (2011). While the former was a commercial failure, the latter was a major success. After a four-year gap, he appeared in the action comedy Happy Bhag Jayegi (2016), which was also commercially successful.

Television roles (2011–present)
In 2011, Sharma appeared in Colors TV's Sasural Simar Ka, which marked his acting debut in television. The show, starring Dipika Kakar and Avika Gor as two sisters who marry two rich brothers, played by Shoaib Ibrahim and Manish Raisinghan, became one of India's top-grossing series, and emerged as the second-longest-running programs of Colors behind Balika Vadhu. Later in 2015, Sharma made a cameo appearance in &TV's female buddy show Dilli Wali Thakur Gurls. He left Sasural Simar Ka in 2017. From 2018 to 2019, Sharma appeared in the series Patiala Babes.

Filmography

Film
 Dev.D (2009) as Canadian boy 
 Teen Patti (2010) as Rammi
 No One Killed Jessica (2011) as Lucky Gill
 Surkhaab (2012) as Manpreet
 Happy Bhag Jayegi (2016) as Winkle
 Dishoom (2016) as Kamlesh bhai 
 Yamla Pagla Deewana Phir se (2018) as Preston 
 Missing (2018) as Nandlal
 Fastey Fasaatey (2019) as Jugnu
 Comedian (2020) as Ashwin Verma

Television

References

External links
 

1982 births
Living people
Indian male film actors
Indian male television actors